Wish You Were Here may refer to:

Film, television, and theater

Film 
 Wish You Were Here (1987 film), a British comedy-drama film by David Leland
 Wish You Were Here (2012 film), an Australian drama/mystery film by Kieran Darcy-Smith 
 Wish You Were Here (2013 film), an American road movie by James O'Brien 
 "Wish You Were Here", a segment of the 1972 horror film Tales from the Crypt

Television
 Wish You Were Here...?, a 1974–2003 UK holiday documentary programme
 Wish You Were Here (American TV series), a 1990 sitcom
 "Wish You Were Here" (Arthur), a 2016 episode
 "Wish You Were Here" (The Avengers), a 1969 episode
 "Wish You Were Here" (Bear in the Big Blue House), a 1998 episode
 "Wish You Were Here" (Californication), a 2009 episode
 "Wish You Were Here" (Grey's Anatomy), a 2009 episode
 "Wish You Were Here" (Jake and the Fatman), a 1989 episode
 "Wish You Were Here" (Once Upon a Time), a 2016 episode

Theatre
 Wish You Were Here (musical), a 1952 Broadway musical
 Wish You Were Here, a 1964 play by John McDonnell

Literature

Fiction
 Wish You Were Here (Holt novel), a 1998 novel by Tom Holt
 Wish You Were Here (Picoult novel), a 2021 novel by Jodi Picoult
 Wish You Were Here (Swift novel), a 2011 novel by Graham Swift
 Wish You Were Here, a 2007 novel by Mike Gayle
 Wish You Were Here, a 2002 novel by Stewart O'Nan

Nonfiction
 Wish You Were Here (book), a 2020 true crime book by John Allore and Patricia Pearson
 Wish You Were Here: The English at Play, a 1976 photobook by Patrick Ward with text by James Cameron
 Wish You Were Here: The Official Biography of Douglas Adams, a 2005 biography of Douglas Adams by Nick Webb

Music 
 Wish You Were Here, a 2006 orchestral work by Nico Muhly

Albums 
 Wish You Were Here (Badfinger album), 1974
 Wish You Were Here (Bob Ostertag album) or the title song, 2016
 Wish You Were Here (Mark Wills album) or the title song (see below), 1998
 Wish You Were Here (Pink Floyd album) or the title song (see below), 1975
 Wish You Were Here (The Ten Tenors album), 2017
 Wish You Were Here, by the Kingsmen, 1991
 Wish You Were Here!, a collection of episodes from the radio show Adventures in Odyssey

Songs 
 "Wish You Were Here" (1952 song), a song from the Broadway musical recorded by Eddie Fisher
 "Wish You Were Here" (Avril Lavigne song), 2011
 "Wish You Were Here" (Barbara Mandrell song), 1981
 "Wish You Were Here" (Delta Goodrem song), 2012
 "Wish You Were Here" (Incubus song), 2001
 "Wish You Were Here" (Mark Wills song), 1999
 "Wish You Were Here" (Pink Floyd song), 1975
 "Wish You Were Here" (Rednex song), 1995
 "Wish U Were Here", by Cody Simpson, 2012
 "Wish You Were Here", by Alice Cooper from Alice Cooper Goes to Hell, 1976
 "Wish You Were Here", by the Bee Gees from One, 1989
 "Wish You Were Here", by Dead or Alive from Sophisticated Boom Boom, 1984
 "Wish You Were Here", by Lee Fields, 2012
 "Wish You Were Here", by Fleetwood Mac from Mirage, 1982
 "Wish You Were Here", by J. J. Cale from Stay Around, 2019
 "Wish U Were Here", by Jamie Foxx from Unpredictable, 2005
 "Wish You Were Here", by the Get Up Kids from On a Wire, 2002
 "Wish You Were Here", by Hey Monday from Beneath It All, 2010
 "Wish You Were Here", by Luminous, 2022
 "Wish You Were Here", by Matt Brouwer from Till the Sunrise, 2012
 "Wish You Were Here", by Mýa from Sugar & Spice, 2008
 "Wish You Were Here", by Nick Lowe from The Abominable Showman, 1983
 "Wish U Were Here", by Pale Waves from Who Am I?, 2021
 "Wish You Were Here", by Ryan Adams from Rock n Roll, 2003
 "Wish You Were Here", by Skepta, 2019

See also 
 I Wish You Were Here (disambiguation)
 "Wish That You Were Here", a 2016 song by Florence and the Machine
 "Wishing You Were Here", a 1974 song by Chicago
 WYWH (disambiguation)